Cumali Bişi (born 15 June 1993) is a Turkish professional footballer who plays as a defensive midfielder for Şanlıurfaspor.

Life and career
Cumali Bişi began his career with Beşiktaş in 2007. He made his professional debut on the last matchday of the 2009–10 Süper Lig season against Bursaspor. He replaced Michael Fink in the 73rd minute.

International career
Cumali Bişi represented Turkey at the 2013 FIFA U-20 World Cup.

References

External links
 
 
 
 

1993 births
People from Gebze
Living people
Turkish footballers
Turkey youth international footballers
Association football midfielders
Beşiktaş J.K. footballers
Çaykur Rizespor footballers
Adana Demirspor footballers
Boluspor footballers
Gaziantep F.K. footballers
Balıkesirspor footballers
Şanlıurfaspor footballers
Süper Lig players
TFF First League players
TFF Second League players